Saucy, Vol. One is a compilation album by American rapper MC Breed. It was released February 18, 1997 for Ichiban Records and was produced by MC Breed, Jazze Pha, DJ Flash and Big Q.

Track listing
"One Puff"- 4:18 
"Da Bomb"- 5:18 
"Salt in My Game"- 4:59 
"Jazze Lude"- 1:08 
"Swats and Flint"- 4:25 
"You, Me and the Other Nigga"- 4:37 (featuring Sonji Mickey, Kool Ace, Jazze Pha)
"Make Me Wanna Scream"- 3:40 (featuring Sonji Mickey)
"Palms Itchin'"- 4:36 
"Ashes to Ashes"- 4:46 
"Clublude"- 1:18 
"Money Makes the World Go Round"- 4:16 
"First You Fuck Me"- 4:18 
"Til We Die"- 5:37 
"One Puff Symphony"- 6:20 
"For Your Mind"- 4:52

References

1997 albums
MC Breed albums
Albums produced by Jazze Pha